Real Personal is an American interview and advice call-in talk show about human sexuality that aired on CNBC from 1990 to 1996. The show was hosted by Bob Berkowitz.

Reception
 cited this show as an example of B-television in her article From the True, the Good, the Beautiful to the Truly Beautiful Goods—audience identification strategies on German "B-Television" programs:

References

External links 

1990s American television talk shows
1990 American television series debuts
1996 American television series endings
CNBC original programming